The 2014 Eastern Kentucky Colonels football team represented Eastern Kentucky University during the 2014 NCAA Division I FCS football season. They were led by seventh-year head coach Dean Hood and played their home games at Roy Kidd Stadium. They were a member of the Ohio Valley Conference (OVC). Eastern Kentucky had an overall record of 9–4 and 6–2 in OVC play to finish in second place. They received an at-large bid to the FCS Playoffs, where they lost in the first round to Indiana State.

Schedule

Source: Schedule

Ranking movements

References

Eastern Kentucky
Eastern Kentucky Colonels football seasons
Eastern Kentucky
Eastern Kentucky Colonels football